Center Valley Grade School is a museum and former one-room school in Center, Outagamie County, Wisconsin. It was added to the National Register of Historic Places in 2011.

History
During the nineteenth century, Center Valley Grade School was one of seven one-room schools serving Center. It closed in the 1950s after Wisconsin eliminated one-room schools.

In 2000, the Friends of the Center Valley Grade School purchased the building. The group spent seven years restoring the building and returning it to the appearance it had during the 1940s. It is open for scheduled tours.

References

School buildings on the National Register of Historic Places in Wisconsin
One-room schoolhouses in Wisconsin
Defunct schools in Wisconsin
Museums in Outagamie County, Wisconsin
School buildings completed in 1888
National Register of Historic Places in Outagamie County, Wisconsin